Paenibacillus vulneris is a Gram-positive, rod-shaped, spore-forming bacterium.  Strains of this species were originally isolated from a necrotic wound on a human.

References

External links
Type strain of Paenibacillus vulneris at BacDive -  the Bacterial Diversity Metadatabase

Paenibacillaceae
Bacteria described in 2012